The smoke-bellied rat (Niviventer eha) is a species of rodent in the family Muridae.
It is found in China, India, Myanmar, and Nepal.

References

Rats of Asia
Niviventer
Rodents of China
Rodents of India
Mammals of Nepal
Mammals described in 1916
Taxonomy articles created by Polbot